Lucija Mlinar (born 6 May 1995) is a Croatian volleyball player. She plays as outside hitter for Turkish club Edremit Bld. Altınoluk.

International career 
She is a member of the Croatia women's national volleyball team. She competed at the 2017 FIVB Volleyball World Grand Prix, and 2021 Women's European Volleyball League, winning a silver medal.

References

External links
Lucija Mlinar at CEV.eu

1995 births
Living people
Croatian women's volleyball players
Croatian expatriate sportspeople in Germany
Croatian expatriate sportspeople in Turkey
Croatian expatriate sportspeople in Switzerland
Sportspeople from Zagreb
Expatriate volleyball players in Switzerland
Expatriate volleyball players in Belgium
Expatriate volleyball players in Hungary
Expatriate volleyball players in Germany
Expatriate volleyball players in Italy
Expatriate volleyball players in Turkey
Competitors at the 2013 Mediterranean Games
Mediterranean Games bronze medalists for Croatia
Mediterranean Games medalists in volleyball